Caroline Slocock (born 30 December 1956) is a British former civil servant and author, who served as the first female private secretary in 10 Downing Street between 1989 and 1991. She joined the Downing Street staff during the premiership of Margaret Thatcher and was the only other woman to be present in the room when Thatcher resigned in November 1990. Slocock continued to work as at Downing Street until 1991, working for Thatcher's successor, John Major. She has written about her time working for Margaret Thatcher and the events that led to the Prime Minister's resignation in "People Like Us: Margaret Thatcher and me". After leaving No 10, she worked for 9 years at the Treasury, where, amongst other things, she advised the Chancellor on public sector priorities and reformed the public expenditure system and also worked to improve the culture and working practices of the Treasury. At the Department for Education and Skills, she then oversaw a major national expansion of childcare and nursery education. She was Chief Executive of the Equal Opportunities Commission between 2002 and 2007, a statutory body which promoted equal opportunities between men and women, and helped achieve significant advances, though many challenges remain. She is currently the founder and Director of the think tank, Civil Exchange, and a founding member of a cross-sectoral leadership network, A Better Way. She is a regular commentator in the media and the author of many publications about government and civil society and about the need for greater investment in early action and social infrastructure. She lives in Suffolk and London and is married to the crime writer John Nightingale. They have two daughters.

References

</ref>

Living people
British civil servants
Conservative Party (UK) officials
Margaret Thatcher
John Major
1956 births